Heathen is the fourth studio album by American metal band Thou. It was released on March 25, 2014 through Gilead Media.

Critical reception

The album generally received rave reviews from music critics. Allmusic critic Gregory Heaney praised the album, writing that it "rewards repeat listens with new surprises, giving anyone with the fortitude to wade through the muck and sludge even more glimpses at the warm, shoegaze center that lives at the heart of this doomy juggernaut." Iann Robinson of CraveOnline awarded the album with a perfect score, stating: "Heathen leaves you breathless, stammering for a way to process everything you’ve just heard." Robinson also added that the band "are able to translate the darkest parts of the human soul into music, and for that we should all be grateful." Pitchfork's Kim Kelly described the album as "a portrait of a band that is in complete harmony with itself, if not the world it inhabits." Michael Nelson of Stereogum regarded the record as "a dark, bombastic, hugely ambitious album of great sorrow, but perhaps even greater beauty," while Spin magazine described it as "the culmination of all that perspiration, almost cinematic in the scope of the suffering and seething anger it portrays." The Quietus' Robin Smith thought the record as "doom metal siren song – its beauty is incidental to a forever kind of pain."

Accolades
{|class="wikitable sortable"
|-
! Publication
! Country
! Accolade
! Rank
|-
| Decibel
| align="center"| US
| Top 40 Albums of 2014
| align="center"| 6
|- 
| NPR
| align="center"| US
| 10 Favorite Metal Albums Of 2014
| align="center"| –
|- 
| Pitchfork
| align="center"| US
| The Best Metal Albums of 2014
| align="center"| 1
|-
| Spin
| align="center"| US
| The 20 Best Metal Albums of 2014
| align="center"| 6
|-
| Stereogum
| align="center"| US
| The 50 Best Metal Albums Of 2014
| align="center"| 9
|-
| Treblezine
| align="center"| US
| Top 10 Metal Albums of 2014
| align="center"| 8
|-
|}

Track listing

Personnel
Thou
 Bryan Funck – vocals
 Andy Gibbs – guitar
 Matthew Thudium – guitar
 Mitch Wells – bass guitar
 Josh Nee – drums

Guest contributions
 Emily McWilliams – vocals
 Derek Zimmer – vocals

Technical personnel
 James Whitten – mixing, recording, production
 Adam Tucker – mastering
 Mike Jones – layout

References

External links
 

2014 albums
Thou (American band) albums